Gindib is a rural locality (a selo) in Kardibsky Selsoviet, Tlyaratinsky District, Republic of Dagestan, Russia. The population was 302 as of 2010. There are 2 streets.

Geography 
Gindib is located 21 km east of Tlyarata (the district's administrative centre) by road. Kardib is the nearest rural locality.

References 

Rural localities in Tlyaratinsky District